Lanester is a commune in the Morbihan department in Brittany, in north-western France.

It is the largest suburb of the city of Lorient, across the river Scorff to the east.

Demographics
Inhabitants of Lanester are called Lanestériens.

Geography

The mouth of the river Scorff separates the town of Lorient from the town of Lanester. Lanester is on the left bank while Lorient is on the right bank. The mouth of river Blavet forms a natural boundary to the east and to the south.

Map

History

Lanester was created later than Lorient, with the development of shipyards on the left bank of the river Scorff in the middle of the nineteenth century. Lanester was created as a new commune in february 26, 1909. Before that, it came within the administrative area of the village of Caudan.

Breton language
The municipality created a linguistic plan through Ya d'ar brezhoneg on 13 July 2006.

In 2008, 5.67% of the children attended the bilingual schools in primary education.

See also
Communes of the Morbihan department

References

External links

Official website 

 Mayors of Morbihan Association 

Communes of Morbihan